Ngawi may refer to:

 Ngawi Regency, a regency of Indonesia
 Ngawi (city), capital of Ngawi Regency
 Ngawi, New Zealand, a village in New Zealand
 Ngawi railway station, a station of Paron District, Ngawi Regency

See also